Gulistan, Golestan or Golastan means "flower land" in Persian language (gol meaning "flower", and -stan or meaning "land").

It may refer to:

Places

Iran 
"Golestan"  most often refers to:
Golestan province in northeast Iran.
 Golestan, Tehran Province, a city in Tehran Province

Alborz Province  
 Gulistan, Alborz, a village in Alborz Province

Ardabil Province 
 Golestan, Ardabil, a village in Nir County
 Golestan-e Bala, a village in Khalkhal County
 Golestan-e Pain, a village in Khalkhal County

Bushehr Province 
 Golestan, Bushehr, a village in Jam County
 Golestan, Dashti, a village in Dashti County

East Azerbaijan Province  
 Golestan-e Olya, a village in Maragheh County
 Golestan-e Sofla, a village in Maragheh County
 Golestan Park, a park in Tabriz, Iran

Fars Province 
 Golestan, Fars, a village in Shiraz County
 Shahrak-e Golestan, a village in Shiraz County

Gilan Province 
 Golestan, Gilan, a village in Lahijan County
 Golestan Sara, a village in Siahkal County

Golestan Province 
 Golestan National Park
 Golestan, Golestan, a village in Golestan Province

Hormozgan Province 
 Golestan, Hormozgan, a village in Hormozgan Province

Isfahan Province 
 Golestan-e Mehdi, a village in Ardestan County
 Golestan-e Shahid Rejai, a village in Ardestan County
 Golastan, Isfahan, a village in Isfahan County
 Golestan, Nain, a village in Nain County
 Golestan Rural District (Isfahan Province), in Falavarjan County

Kerman Province 
 Golestan, Anar, a village in Anar County
 Golestan, Arzuiyeh, a village in Arzuiyeh County
 Golestan, Kahnuj, a village in Kahnuj County
 Golestan, Sirjan, a village in Sirjan County
 Golestan Rural District (Kerman Province), in Sirjan County

Khuzestan Province 
 Golestan, Masjed Soleyman, a village in Khuzestan Province

Kohgiluyeh and Boyer-Ahmad Province 
 Golestan-e Emamzadeh Jafar, a village in Gachsaran County

Lorestan Province 
 Golestan, Lorestan, a village in Lorestan Province
 Golestan, alternate name of Golestanak, Lorestan

Mazandaran Province 
 Golestan Mahalleh, a village in Tonekabon County

North Khorasan Province 
 Golestan Rural District (North Khorasan Province)

Qom Province 
 Golestan, Qom, a village in Qom Province

Razavi Khorasan Province 
 Golestan, Firuzeh, a village in Firuzeh County
 Golestan, Mahvelat, a village in Mahvelat County

Semnan Province 
 Golestan, Semnan, a village in Semnan Province, Iran

South Khorasan Province 
 Golestan, South Khorasan, a village in South Khorasan Province, Iran

Tehran Province 
 Golestan, Tehran Province, a suburban city of Tehran
 Golestan Palace in Tehran
 Golestan District, an administrative subdivision of Tehran Province

Zanjan Province 
 Golestan, Zanjan, a village in Zanjan County
 Golestan, Tarom, a village in Tarom County

Armenia and Azerbaijan 
 Gulistan, former name of Nor Aznaberd, Armenia
 Gülüstan, Goranboy, a village in the Shahumian region of Nagorno-Karabakh, Azerbaijan 
 Gülüstan, Nakhchivan, Azerbaijan

Pakistan 
 Gulistan, Balochistan, located in Qilla Abdullah District, Balochistan
 Gulistan, Punjab, village in Punjab
 Gulistan Tehsil
 Gulistan-e-Johar, a neighbourhood of Gulshan-e-Iqbal Town in Karachi, Sindh
 Gulistan-e-Bahar, a neighbourhood of Orangi Town in Karachi, Sindh
 Gulistan-e-Hadeed, a neighbourhood of Gulshan-e-Iqbal Town in Karachi, Sindh

Tajikistan 
 Guliston, Rudaki District, a village near Dushanbe
 Guliston, Sughd, a city in Sughd Region
 Guliston, Shahriston District, a village in Sughd Region
 Guliston, Vahdat, a part of the city Vahdat

Other places 
 Gulistan District in Farah Province, Afghanistan
 Gulistan, Dhaka, in Dhaka, Bangladesh
 Gulistan underpass in Dhaka, Bangladesh
 Gulistan, Baramulla, in Jammu and Kashmir, India
 Gulistan Terrace & Gulistan Cottages, Rathmines, Dublin, Ireland
 Guliston, Uzbekistan

Other uses 
 Gulistan (book), by the Persian poet Saadi
 "Gulistān"—Nocturne for Piano, a piano piece by English composer Kaikhosru Shapurji Sorabji
 Gulistan rug, created by Karagheusian Rug Mill
 Treaty of Gulistan (1813), between imperial Russia and Qajarid Persia signed at Gulistan, Nagorno-Karabakh

See also 
 Gulshan (disambiguation)